The ÆON Bukit Tinggi Shopping Centre is a shopping mall built on a  landmass with a gross built-up floor area of approximately . Also popularly known as Jusco Bukit Tinggi, the shopping mall is located in the Bandar Bukit Tinggi township, Klang, Selangor, Malaysia.The mall is the largest ÆON (JUSCO) shopping centre in Malaysia and Southeast Asia (and the largest in Asia).

The RM350 million (over US$111 million) shopping mall opened its doors on 24 November 2007 and was officiated by the Sultan of Selangor, Sultan Sharafuddin Idris Shah. The shopping complex has over 3,000 car park bays.

The AEON store is the anchor tenant. Other stores include restaurants, cafes, specialty and services stores, food court, leisure and entertainment stores, cinemas, sports and book stores.

By February 2024, the shopping mall will be directly connected to the Bandar Bukit Tinggi LRT station on the Shah Alam line. It is the first AEON to have a joint hotel and an apartment, The Landmark. AEON Bukit Tinggi receives almost more than 250,000 customers during weekdays and more than 400,000 during weekends.

Accommodation (part of AEON Bukit Tinggi) 
 The Landmark Apartment and Suites
 Canvas Hotel and Suites
 Lead Suites

Gallery

See also
 List of shopping malls in Malaysia

References

Klang (city)
Shopping malls in Selangor
Shopping malls established in 2007
Aeon Group
2007 establishments in Malaysia